Lagonissi (Greek: Λαγονήσι meaning "jackrabbit island") is a seaside residential area in the southern part of Kalyvia Thorikou in East Attica. It is situated close to the shore and on a peninsula by the Saronic Gulf. Lagonisi is located approximately 30 km southeast of Athens and 35 km northwest of Cape Sounio. Restaurant facilities, cafeterias and bars are located mainly at the heart of Lagonissi, close to Kalyvion Avenue (the road connecting Lagonissi with Kalyvia Thorikou). It is part of Athens metropolitan area.

Beaches 

Lagonisi has many beautiful sandy beaches including those of Pefko, Agios Nikolas and Galazia Akti.

Education 

The increasing number of new residents, most notably from the southern suburbs of Athens has led to the construction of public schools for children of all ages. Most specifically, the last decades there have been built two nursery schools, two primary schools, one middle school and one high school. There are also two private nursery schools, one of whom is English-speaking.

Transportation 

Greek National Road 91 connects Lagonissi with Athens and Sounio, while Thorikou road connects Lagonisi with Greek National Road 89.  OASA (Athens Urban Transport Organisation) operates a frequent all-year round bus service to and from Elliniko metro station with the designation 122. The average travel time between Lagonisi and Elliniko metro station is about 50 minutes. Furthermore, there is a KTEL coach service connecting central Athens with the entire coastal area of western Attica, from Palaio Faliro to Cape Sounion. An inter-municipality bus service operating four to five times per day connects Lagonissi with Kalyvia Thorikou. Taxi service is available as well.

Sports

Lagonisi has an indoor basketball/volleyball arena located close to the middle school. There are numerous outdoor basketball courts and football pitches, a tennis court and two beach volleyball courts. Furthermore, there is a gym and many indoor areas provide lessons for martial arts, yoga and aerobic exercises. An equestrian club called "St.George" is located in the eastern outskirts of the community as well.

References

Populated places in East Attica